The 1957 Cal Aggies football team represented the College of Agriculture at Davis—now known as the University of California, Davis—as a member of the Far Western Conference (FWC) during the 1957 NCAA College Division football season. Led by third-year head coach Will Lotter, the Aggies compiled an overall record of 1–7–1 with a mark of 0–5 in conference play, placing last out of six teams in the FWC. The team was outscored by its opponents 210 to 59 for the season and was held to a touchdown or less in six of their nine games. The Cal Aggies played home games at Aggie Field in Davis, California.

Schedule

Notes

References

Cal Aggies
UC Davis Aggies football seasons
Cal Aggies football